IANSA may refer to:

IANSA (company), a Chilean sugar refining company founded in 1953. 
IANSA (NGO), an international non-governmental organisation  against gun violence. 
Iansã, an alternative name for the Orisha Oya in Latin America